Purple is the fourth studio album by American metal band Baroness. It was released December 18, 2015 through the band's newly founded label Abraxan Hymns. It is the first album to be released by the band following their involvement in the 2012 bus accident that left nine people injured; it is also the first album to feature new band members Nick Jost and Sebastian Thomson, playing bass/keyboards and drums respectively and the last album to feature Pete Adams before his departure from the band in 2017.

The first single from the album, "Chlorine & Wine", was released on August 28, 2015. The second single from the album, "Shock Me", was released on November 15, 2015 and reached number 28 on the Mainstream Rock Tracks chart in the US. The album was included at number 23 on Rock Sounds top 50 releases of 2015 list and at number 7 on Rolling Stone'''s Best Metal Albums of 2015 list.

Critical receptionPurple was met with critical acclaim from music critics. At Metacritic (a review aggregator site which assigns a normalized rating out of 100 from music critics), based on 19 critics, the album received a score of 85/100, which indicates "universal acclaim".

In Dom Lawson's review of the album for The Guardian'', he described the album as a "far more focused and fiery beast; both a return to the stormy riffing and skewed melodies of old and a subtle but unmistakable lunge for mainstream glory. It's a balance they pull off brilliantly." Pitchfork's Brandon Stosuy was likewise praising of the album, writing that "These are some of the biggest, strongest songs that Baroness has written; it's rock music that folds in their more metal leanings, along with something more delicate and spare. The hooks and melodies are their best."

Track listing

Personnel
John Dyer Baizley – lead vocals, rhythm guitar, acoustic guitar, lyrics, bells, glockenspiel, Wurlitzer electric piano
Pete Adams – lead guitar, acoustic guitar, backing vocals
Nick Jost – bass, double bass, piano, synthesizers, additional backing vocals in "Chlorine & Wine"
Sebastian Thomson – drums, additional backing vocals in "Chlorine & Wine"

Charts

Accolades

References

 

2015 albums
Baroness (band) albums
Albums produced by Dave Fridmann
Albums recorded at Tarbox Road Studios